ARA La Argentina was a light cruiser, designed for training naval cadets, built for the Argentine Navy. The ship was authorised in 1934, and the contract was put out to tender in 1935, being won by the British company Vickers-Armstrongs at a cost of 6 million pesos.

La Argentina was built in Barrow-in-Furness, England. She was laid down on 11 January 1936, launched 16 March 1937 and not completed until 31 January 1939, being delayed by the British re-armament programme. She was decommissioned in 1972 and scrapped.

Design
The design was based on British practice, being modified to meet the requirements of the Argentinians for a training ship with 60 cadets.

Service
The ship sailed from Britain in February 1939 and arrived at La Plata on 2 March, being commissioned on 12 April 1939. She made several training cruises before the war but was placed in the active squadron to maintain Argentine neutrality. After the war she made many training cruises before retiring in 1972.

Gallery

See also 
 List of cruisers
 List of ships of the Argentine Navy

References

 M.J. Whitley, Cruisers of World War Two, 1995, Arms and Armour Press

Further reading 
 Burzaco, Ricardo. Acorazados y Cruceros De La Armada Argentina. Eugenio B, Buenos Aires, 1997.  (in Spanish)
 Arguindeguy, Pablo. Apuntes sobre los buques de la Armada Argentina (1810–1970). Comando en Jefe de la Armada, Buenos aires, 1972. ISBN n/d  (in Spanish)

Cruisers of the Argentine Navy
Cruisers of the United Kingdom
Ships built in Barrow-in-Furness
1937 ships
World War II cruisers of Argentina